José Alberto Sánchez Robles (born 19 January 1996 in Zapopan, Jalisco) is a Mexican professional footballer who last played for Atlante F.C.

References

External links
 

1996 births
Living people
Mexican footballers
Association football forwards
Atlante F.C. footballers
Ascenso MX players
Tercera División de México players
Footballers from Jalisco
People from Zapopan, Jalisco